Case Closed: The Crimson Love Letter, known as  in Japan, is a 2017 Japanese animated film directed by Kobun Shizuno and written by Takahiro Okura. It is the twenty-first installment of the Case Closed film series based on the manga series of the same name by Gosho Aoyama, following the 2016 film Case Closed: The Darkest Nightmare. The film was released in Japan on April 15, 2017.

Plot
A bombing case at Nichiuri TV in autumn. The Satsuki Cup, which crowns the winner of Japan's Ogura Hyakunin Isshu based competitive karuta tournament, is currently being filmed inside the facility. The incident results in a big commotion and, while the building is burning to ashes, the only people left inside are Heiji and Kazuha. They get rescued just in time by Conan, who rushes to the scene. Both the identity and motive of the bomber are unknown.

While confusion takes over due to the explosion, Conan meets a mysterious beautiful girl who claims she is "Heiji's fiancée". Her name is Momiji Ooka and she is the Kyoto High School karuta champion. As fate would have it, Kazuha is going to face Momiji in the Hyakunin Isshu competition, so she begins to train with the help of Heiji's mother, Shizuka, who is a skilled karuta player.

At the same time, in a Japanese house in Arashiyama, Kyoto's outskirts, the reigning Satsuki Cup champion is murdered. Pictures of the crime scene reveal Momji's presence. Additionally, several karuta cards were spread around the victim.

Conan and Heiji, along with the Osaka and Kyoto police departments, begin their investigation on the Satsuki Cup and the related murder case. As the inquiry goes on, they come across a secret connected with the Hyakunin Isshu.

Cast

Production
Aoyama cited the live-action adaptations of Yuki Suetsugu's manga series Chihayafuru among his inspirations for making Hyakunin Isshu and karuta subjects of a Case Closed film. He noted the Kyoto-based Karuta Queen, or national champion in the women's division, as depicted in Chihayafuru, as the model for characters in The Crimson Love Letter. The visual poster for this film was unveiled on January 17, 2017.

Music
The song reached number five on the Oricon Singles Chart. The single has sold 326,305 units in Japan, including 76,305 physical units and 250,000 digital downloads.

Box office
For its opening weekend, The Crimson Love Letter set a new franchise record by selling 987,568 tickets and earning ¥1,286,928,000. The film grossed  over its theatrical run in Japan and thereby broke the cumulative box office record for the series as well (up until it was surpassed by Zero the Enforcer). Overseas, the film grossed $3,028,087 in South Korea, Thailand and Australia.

Release 
An English dub produced by Bang Zoom! Entertainment was screened at Chara Expo 2019. On November 19, 2020, the film was made available for digital streaming on Amazon Prime Video. It was released on home video by Discotek Media on December 29, 2020.

Reception
In January 2018, The Crimson Love Letter was nominated for the Japan Academy Film Prize of "Excellent Animation of the Year." Rebecca Silverman of Anime News Network reviewed the film in 2020. While finding criticism in the romantic subplot being weak and the overarching mystery requiring some karuta knowledge to solve it, she praised the "beautiful use of color and animation" and the comradery between Conan and Heiji, concluding that: "The Crimson Love Letter is an all-around enjoyable film. The mystery is interesting and fair play, the characters' interactions are fun, and the whole thing is very nice to look at."

References

External links
Conan Movie website

2017 anime films
2017 films
Crimson Love Letter
Discotek Media
Films directed by Kobun Shizuno
Films with screenplays by Takeharu Sakurai
TMS Entertainment
Toho animated films